Jungle Patrol (aka  West of Tomorrow) is a 1948 American drama film directed by Joseph M. Newman and written by Francis Swann and Robertson White. The film stars Kristine Miller, Arthur Franz, Ross Ford, Tommy Noonan, Gene Reynolds and Richard Jaeckel. The film was released on September 24, 1948, by 20th Century Fox. Jungle Patrol was set in World War II and was based on William Bowers' play West of Tomorrow.

Plot
In 1942, eight United States Army Air Forces fighter pilots flying P-40 fighter aircraft and a support crew defend a remote airfield under construction in New Guinea. Waves of Japanese attacks threaten the air base, and ultimately will lead to attacks on Australia. Spirits are raised when Jean Gillis (Kristine Miller), an attractive United Service Organizations entertainer flies in on a supply aircraft from Brisbane, the first of a group of five entertainers coming to do a show for the troops.

Jean gets to know the pilots and some of them tell her about their wives and sweethearts and their hopes for postwar life. Each day as they fly out, the pilots seem to be cheating death. The group has scored 100 victories without losing a man. One of the group recalls the 1934 film Death Takes a Holiday, where Death takes a few days off from extinguishing lives in order to explore human nature, and wonders if it is happening to them.

During an attack on Japanese aircraft, as Jean listens to a radio monitoring their conversations , one pilot's aircraft catches fire but the flames mysteriously extinguish. Later, Jean finds a "scoreboard" detailing their missions, but when she displays it prominently, the men are uneasy. Maj. Wright (Ross Ford ), known affectionately as "Skipper," then receives a message that the rest of Jean's troupe is grounded, so she volunteers to do a solo show, after which she dances with several of the pilots.

Lt. "Mace" Willard (Arthur Franz) tells Jean that he has seen her before in an anti-war play in New York. She reveals that her husband was killed at Dunkirk. After the eight fliers host a meager dinner for Jean, the skipper and Jean go to her tent are attracted to each other. The next morning there is a "scramble" and most of the pilots take off, leaving Mace on ground control.

After Jean learns that an aircraft is coming for her that afternoon, the skipper leaves to join his pilots. They all come under heavy attack and two of them are killed. Mace joins the others in the air, but all are shot down, including the skipper, who manages to land safely. Mace is trapped by Japanese fighters and is killed as they inflict great damage on the island. The skipper and Jean reunite to face whatever the future may bring.

Cast  

 Kristine Miller as Jean Gillis
 Arthur Franz as Lt. "Mace" Willard
 Ross Ford as Maj. Skipper Wright
 Tommy Noonan as Lt. "Ham" Hamilton 
 Gene Reynolds as Lt. Marion Minor
 Richard Jaeckel as Lt. Dick Carter
 Mickey Knox as Lt. Louie Rasti
 Harry Lauter as Lt. Derby
 William Murphy as Lt. Johnny Murphy
 G. Pat Collins as Sgt. Hanley

Production
Several  Curtiss P-40N Warhawk fighters were hired for Jungle Patrol. Other aerial sequences utilized stock footage and scale model work. The film's working title was "West of Tomorrow".

Reception
Jungle Patrol had its world premiere on September 24, 1948 at a national convention of the Air Force Association, held at the Hotel Commodore in New York. Reviewers commented on the film's "unusual, and economical, use of offscreen voices, heard on a radio intercom, to depict all of the battle sequences."

References

Notes

Citations

Bibliography

 Beck, Simon D. The Aircraft-Spotter's Film and Television Companion. Jefferson, North Carolina: McFarland and Company, 2016. .

External links
 
 
 'Jungle Patrol' at BFI

1948 films
20th Century Fox films
American drama films
1948 drama films
Films directed by Joseph M. Newman
American films based on plays
American aviation films
Films about the United States Army Air Forces
Films scored by Emil Newman
Films scored by Arthur Lange
American black-and-white films
Pacific War films
1940s English-language films
1940s American films